Mahdalynivka Raion was a raion (district) of Dnipropetrovsk Oblast, southeastern-central Ukraine. Its administrative centre was located at the urban-type settlement of Mahdalynivka. The raion was abolished on 18 July 2020 as part of the administrative reform of Ukraine, which reduced the number of raions of Dnipropetrovsk Oblast to seven. The area of Mahdalynivka Raion was merged into Novomoskovsk Raion.

At the time of disestablishment, the raion consisted of three hromadas:
 Chernechchina rural hromada with the administration in the selo of Chernechchina;
 Lychkove rural hromada with the administration in the selo of Lychkove;
 Mahdalynivka settlement hromada with the administration in Mahdalynivka.

References

Former raions of Dnipropetrovsk Oblast
1925 establishments in Ukraine
Ukrainian raions abolished during the 2020 administrative reform